Harold Wesley Kenney, Jr. (January 3, 1926 – January 13, 2015) was an American television producer and director whose career extended from the medium's formative years in the early 1950s, into the 2000s, and included thousands of episodes, both primetime and daytime, as well as five Emmy wins and eight nominations. He was frequently billed as Wes Kenney.

Early years
Shortly after graduating from Carnegie Mellon University’s College of Engineering in 1951, Kenney was hired by the DuMont Television Network. According to the 2004 book The Forgotten Network: DuMont and the Birth of American Television, Kenney directed up to twelve different broadcasts each day during his career at the network and its flagship station WABD. This was because most of DuMont's programs were broadcast live, and were often done on small budgets. From 1950 to 1954 he directed many episodes of Rocky King Detective.  Kenney continued to direct many programs after DuMont's dissolution in 1956.

Daytime dramas
He is best known for his work on soap operas, producing and directing Days of Our Lives from 1968 to 1979, and then becoming Co-Executive Producer of The Young and the Restless, a spot he held from 1982 to 1987. Under Kenney's run as Y&R's Co-Executive Producer, he helped the show win three Daytime Emmys for Outstanding Drama Series in 1983, 1985, and 1986. From 1987 to 1989, Kenney replaced the legendary Gloria Monty as Executive Producer of General Hospital. He became General Hospitals Head Writer during the 1988 WGA strike.

Kenney's directing credits include All in the Family, Big John, Little John, Inside Detective, and Flo.

Personal life
He married actress Heather North in 1971, after meeting her on the set of Days of Our Lives, where she was playing the part of Sandy Horton.

After Kenney retired from directing, he was a professor at the UCLA School of Theater, Film and Television. He died of cardiac arrest at Saint John's Health Center on January 13 2015, just 10 days after his 89th birthday.

Selected filmography
 Filthy Rich (1982) TV series
 Big John, Little John (1976) TV series
 Far Out Space Nuts (1975) TV series
 All in the Family TV series (6 episodes, 1974–1975)
 Distant Early Warning (1975) (TV Movie)
 Murder in the First Person Singular (1974) (TV Movie)
 Days of Our Lives (1965) TV series
 My Favorite Martian TV series (2 episodes, 1965)
 Your First Impression (1962) TV series
 Rocky King, Inside Detective (The Forgotten Network says he directed most of the episodes produced during its 1950-1954 run)

References

Sources
 Weinstein, D. (2004). The Forgotten Network: DuMont and the Birth of American Television. Philadelphia: Temple University Press.

External links
 
 

1926 births
2015 deaths
Soap opera producers
American soap opera writers
Daytime Emmy Award winners
Carnegie Mellon University College of Engineering alumni
UCLA School of Theater, Film and Television faculty
American television directors
American television producers
Screenwriters from California
Burials at Forest Lawn Memorial Park (Hollywood Hills)